Merilyn is a feminine given name.

List of people with the given name 
 Merilyn Gómez Pozos (born 1981), Mexican politician
 Merilyn Phillips (born 1957), Caymanian former cyclist
 Merilyn Simonds (born 1949), Canadian writer
 Merilyn Wiseman (1941– 2019), New Zealand potter

List of people with the middle name 
 Jean Merilyn Simmons (1929–2010), British actress and singer

See also 
 Marilyn (given name)
 Merrilyn
 Merlin

Feminine given names
English feminine given names
Spanish feminine given names